Urban Rangers may refer to:
 A fictional scouting group on the show Ed, Edd n Eddy
 Los Angeles Urban Rangers
 Urban Rangers (film), a 1995 Philippine film directed by Jose Balagtas